The Bernoulli Society is a professional association which aims to further the progress of probability and mathematical statistics, founded as part of the International Statistical Institute in 1975. It is named after the Bernoulli family of mathematicians and scientists whose researchers covered "most areas of scientific knowledge".

The society publishes two journals, Bernoulli and Stochastic Processes and their Applications, and a newsletter, Bernoulli News. Additionally, it co-sponsors several other journals including Electronic Communications in Probability, Electronic Journal of Probability, Electronic Journal of Statistics, Probability Surveys, and Statistics Surveys.

References

External links
Bernoulli Society for Mathematical Statistics and Probability

Statistical societies